Eileen Creedon (born 12 February 1957) is an Irish judge who has served as a Judge of the High Court since June 2017.

She was Chief State Solicitor of Ireland from 2012 until her appointment to the Bench in 2017.

She qualified as a solicitor in 1987, and was educated at University College Cork and the Incorporated Law Society of Ireland. She was Chief Prosecution Solicitor (and previously Deputy) in the Office of the Irish Director of Public Prosecutions from 2007 until 2012. She joined the Chief State Solicitor's Office in 1995, which is a constituent element of the Office of the Attorney General of Ireland.

References

Living people
Alumni of University College Cork
Irish solicitors
Irish women lawyers
High Court judges (Ireland)
Irish women judges
1957 births